Inner Mongolia Zhongyou Football Club, commonly referred to as Hohhot, was a professional Chinese football club that last participated in the China League One division under licence from the Chinese Football Association (CFA). The team was based in Hohhot, Inner Mongolia and their home stadium was the 51,632 capacity Hohhot City Stadium. Their majority shareholders were the Hohhot Sports Bureau and Shanghai Zhongyou Real Estate Group.

History
On 8 October 2011 Shanxi Jiayi football club was officially established by the Shanghai Zhongyou Real Estate Group who formed a senior team predominantly comprised from players from the Taiyuan University of Technology. With the aid of the Sports Bureau of Shanxi Province a youth team and women's team was also established and the Shanxi Sports Centre Stadium was chosen to be the club's home ground. They registered to play within the third tier of the Chinese football league system in the 2012 league season while the club chose white shirts and black shorts as their home uniform. In their debut season they however decided to move to the artificial turf ground Wanbailin Stadium and later Taiyuan Institute of Electrical Engineering Stadium to play their home games. On the field the club made their debut in the 2012 Chinese FA Cup where they were knocked out in the first round by Shanghai Pudong Zobon F.C. 3–1 while in their first season they finished ninth within their group.

The club owners decided not to compete within the 2013 league season after a disappointing debut campaign. Wang Bo replaced Wu Jianwen as the club's manager and the team went through an extensive rebuilding process in preparation for the 2014 league season as well as changing the club's name to Taiyuan Zhongyou Jiayi. The rebuilding process would be a big success and the club would come runners-up within the league to Jiangxi Liansheng F.C. that saw them gain promotion to the second tier for the first time. Despite the promotion the club officially admitted the financial difficulties required with the higher level of professionalism and would consider relocating the team to gain the necessary investment.

On 5 January 2015 the Hohhot, Inner Mongolia Government Information Office held a press conference to announce that the Hohhot Sports Bureau would be investing and relocating the team to their city, which resulted in the name change of Nei Mongol Zhongyou.

Name history
2011–2013: Shanxi Jiayi
2014: Taiyuan Zhongyou Jiayi
2015–2018: Nei Mongol Zhongyou
2019–2021: Inner Mongolia Zhongyou

Current squad

First team squad
As of 13 September 2020

Reserve squad
As of 5 March 2019

Out on loan

Coaching staff

Managerial history

 Wu Jianwen (2012)
 Wang Bo (2014–2017)
 Raül Agné(2018)
 Wang Bo (2018)
 Chen Yang (2019)
 Choi Jin-han (2020–)

Results
All-time league rankings

As of the end of 2019 season.

Shanxi Jiayi did not compete in 2013.
 in North Group.  In group stage.

Key
<div>

 Pld = Played
 W = Games won
 D = Games drawn
 L = Games lost
 F = Goals for
 A = Goals against
 Pts = Points
 Pos = Final position

 DNQ = Did not qualify
 DNE = Did not enter
 NH = Not Held
 – = Does Not Exist
 R1 = Round 1
 R2 = Round 2
 R3 = Round 3
 R4 = Round 4

 F = Final
 SF = Semi-finals
 QF = Quarter-finals
 R16 = Round of 16
 Group = Group stage
 GS2 = Second group stage
 QR1 = First qualifying round
 QR2 = Second qualifying round
 QR3 = Third qualifying round

References

External links
Club page at The Sport Website of Huhhot

 
Defunct football clubs in China
Association football clubs established in 2011
Association football clubs disestablished in 2021
2011 establishments in China
2021 disestablishments in China